Brioche Dorée is a French chain of bakery-café restaurants founded in 1976 and originally started in Brest. The company was founded by Louis Le Duff, current president of Groupe Le Duff. The name means "Golden Brioche" in French.

It serves over 270,000 customers every day in 443 locations worldwide, 60% of which are franchised, located mainly in France.  Many of their international locations are inside airports and train stations.

In 2013, the result of a survey published in France by the Huffington Post indicates that Brioche Dorée is ranked second, behind Paul, on a list of 17 chains of fast-food in France.

History
Louis Le Duff opened his first Brioche Dorée establishment in 1976, in Brest , France, with the equivalent of €1,500  of personal contribution. On this occasion, he inaugurated the first “French-style” fast food establishment, a concept he had brought back from his stays in the United States.

The company developed into a franchise in 1992.

References

External links 
 Official website

Bakery cafés
Companies based in Brittany
Fast-food chains of France
Restaurants established in 1976
French companies established in 1976
Coffeehouses and cafés in France